The water-willow stem borer (Papaipema cataphracta) is a moth of the family Noctuidae. Its larvae tunnel into the stems of the water-willow plant (Decodon verticillatus) and it is found in the parts of the eastern United States where this plant grows.

Description
The water-willow stem borer is a robustly-built moth with a greyish hairy body. It has a wingspan varying from 32 to 38 millimetres. The forewings are buff or straw-coloured, darker at the base and in the peripheral region which is separated by a narrow dark band. There are a number of roughly circular spots which are a pale ochre colour, outlined in brown. The hind wings are a pinkish-tan colour. The adults can be seen flying in September and October.

Habitat
This moth is found in wetland areas of the eastern United States where the water-willow (Decodon verticillatus) grows. This can be found in swampland, ditches and in shallow water at the edges of ponds, lakes and streams. It often forms tangled clumps and occurs from Maine to Florida and west to Minnesota, Tennessee and Louisiana.

Life history
The adult female lays eggs on the stems of water-willow in September and October. These hatch in the spring and the larvae tunnel into the stem. Here they grow, moulting several times, feeding on the vascular tissue of the plant and creating galleries. They pupate in August, undergo metamorphosis and emerge as adults a month later.

References

Papaipema